Dolomedes karschi is a species of spider of the genus Dolomedes. It is endemic to Sri Lanka.

See also 
 List of Pisauridae species

References

Pisauridae
Endemic fauna of Sri Lanka
karschi
Spiders of Asia
Spiders described in 1913